The 2011 RBC Bank Women's Challenger is a professional tennis tournament played on clay courts. It is part of the 2011 ITF Women's Circuit. It took place in Raleigh, North Carolina, United States in 9 and 15 May 2011.

Singles entrants

Seeds

 Rankings are as of May 2, 2010.

Other entrants
The following players received wildcards into the singles main draw:
  Chieh-yu Hsu
  Simone Kalhorn
  Lena Litvak
  Asia Muhammad

The following players received entry from the qualifying draw:
  Alexandra Mueller
  Jessica Pegula
  Marie-Ève Pelletier
  Yasmin Schnack

The following players received entry by a lucky loser spot:
  Alexis King

Champions

Singles

 Petra Rampre def.  Camila Giorgi, 6–3, 6–2

Doubles

 Sharon Fichman /  Marie-Ève Pelletier def.  Beatrice Capra /  Asia Muhammad, 6–1, 6–3

External links
Official Website
ITF Search

RBC Bank Women's Challenger
Clay court tennis tournaments